Pseudosenefeldera is a plant genus of the family Euphorbiaceae first described as a genus in 2001. It contains only one known species, Pseudosenefeldera inclinata, native to Panama and to northern and west-central South America (Venezuela, Colombia, Ecuador, Peru, Bolivia, northwestern Brazil (Amazonas + Acre)).

References

External links
Pictures of Pseudosenefeldera inclinata

Hippomaneae
Monotypic Euphorbiaceae genera
Trees of Peru